Lori Glaze is an American scientist and the director of NASA's Science Mission Directorate's Planetary Science Division. She was a member of the Inner Planets Panel during the most recent Planetary Science Decadal Survey, and has had a role on the Executive Committee of NASA's Venus Exploration Analysis Group (VEXAG) for several years, serving as the group's Chair since 2013.

She has been involved with many NASA-sponsored Venus mission concept formulation studies, including as a member of the Venus Flagship Science and Technology Definition Team (2009), as Science Champion for the Venus Mobile Explorer (2010), and Co-Science Champion for the Venus Intrepid Tessera Lander (2010).

Life 
Glaze has been an advocate for women in science and for the importance of understanding Venus in our quest to better understand Earth. Glaze has more than 15 years of scientific management experience, including over ten years as the Vice President of Proxemy Research, Inc. She also spent three years as Associate Laboratory Chief and three years as Deputy Director in the Solar System Exploration Division at NASA's Goddard Space Flight Center.

Glaze was the Principal Investigator for a proposed NASA Discovery mission to Venus, Deep Atmosphere Venus Investigation of Noble gases, Chemistry, and Imaging (DAVINCI). This mission would send a probe on a journey through Venus' atmosphere, descending over the planet's roughest and most geologically complex terrain. The DAVINCI probe would explore the planet's atmosphere from top to bottom, including the deep atmospheric layers largely hidden from Earth-based instruments and orbiting spacecraft. DAVINCI would be the first U.S. probe in nearly four decades to target Venus' atmosphere.

Personal life 
Glaze is married to former Pantera and Lord Tracy singer and frontman Terry Glaze. They have two daughters.

Professional achievements and awards 
2013 to Present: Chair, Venus Exploration Analysis Group (VEXAG)
2013 to Present: Member, Planetary Science Subcommittee of the NASA Advisory Council
2009 to 2010: Special Act Award for Leadership (Science Champion) of two Planetary Decadal Mission Concept Studies (Venus Mobile Explorer, Venus Intrepid Tessera Lander)
2009 to 2010: Member of National Academy of Science Decadal Survey, Inner Planets Panel
2009 to 2013: Venus Exploration Analysis Group (VEXAG) Steering Committee Member
2008 to 2009: Member of NASA's Venus Flagship Science and Technology Development Team
2007 to 2012: Associate Editor for the Journal of Geophysical Research, Solid Earth

References

External links 
 Sciences and Exploration Directorate

Living people
Planetary scientists
Women planetary scientists
Year of birth missing (living people)